The Cannery Workers and Farm Laborers Union, Local 7 was the first Filipino-led union in the United States.

Founded in 1933 as the Cannery Workers and Farm Laborers Union, Local 18257 of the American Federation of Labor (AFL), it represented Alaska salmon cannery workers and farm workers. In 1937, the union became Cannery Workers and Farm Laborers Union, Local 7 of the United Cannery, Agricultural, Packing, and Allied Workers of America. In 1945, Local 7 became affiliated with the Food, Tobacco, Agricultural, and Allied Workers. In 1951 the union became Local 37 of International Longshore and Warehouse Union, and around 1987 it became Region 37 of IBU/ILWU. The membership historically was Filipino American cannery workers.

History

Founding
The Cannery Workers' and Farm Laborers' Union was organized June 19, 1933 in Seattle to represent the primarily Filipino-American laborers who worked in the Alaska salmon canneries. Filipino Alaskeros first appeared in the canneries around 1911. In the 1920s as exclusionary immigration laws went into effect, they replaced the Japanese, who had replaced the Chinese in the canneries. Workers were recruited through labor contractors who were paid to provide a work crew for the summer canning season. The contractor paid workers wages and other expenses. This system led to many abuses and harsh working conditions from which grew the movement toward unionization. Attempts to unionize in the salmon canneries was neither new, nor unique to the Filipinos, as during 1867 and again in 1877, the Chinese employees in the canneries that preceded them had also attempted to organize and strike for better job stability and wages, but with little to no improvement to their working conditions. Prior to 1936, the CWFLU also had to compete with other unions such as the Fishermen and Cannery Workers' Industrial Union (FCWIU), a union sponsored by the Trade Union Unity League as a rival and in response to the CWFLU's slow approach to combating the issue of contracting, but the FCWIU was dissolved in 1935.

Virgil Duyungan
The CWFLU, under the leadership of its first President, Virgil Duyungan, was chartered as Local 19257 by the American Federation of Labor in 1933. Duyungan, prior to his presidency worked in a number of jobs such as smelting, cooking and as a contractor for agricultural workers in crops such as hops, apples, and peaches. He was also married in Washington state during 1924 and had seven children with Margaret Duyungan Mislang, a white woman born in Seattle to Scottish immigrants who would later marry one of Virgil's union colleagues, Joe Mislang. As the Union President, Duyungan testified at the National Recovery Act hearings in San Francisco, 1934, where he attempted to expose practices of exploitation and corruption in Alaskan canneries. He testified that, along with issues of drug and alcohol use, gambling and violation of contracts such as starting work times, there was the issue of sexual perversions white homosexual boys, some as young as 14, who were recruited and smuggled into Bristol Bay, and that typically older homosexual transvestites were hired as prostitutes for cannery workers. On the night of December 1, 1936 at the Gyokku Ken Café, a Japanese restaurant which was a usual location for union meetings, Dunyungan and union secretary Aurelio Simon were shot and killed by the nephew of a labor contractor, Placidio Patron, who also died the same night. After Duyungan's death, the union was now more determined to end the contract labor system, and accomplished this after signing an agreement in April 1937 with the salmon canners, outlawing labor agents and labor contractors in the industry. Also, despite this setback the union was able to win a hiring hall. In November 1937, the union voted Ireneo R. Cabatit as the new President, who worked closely alongside Conrad Espe, a Norwegian American labor organizer who also took a leading role in the union, being considered one of the best leading members of the union. Under Cabatit and Espe, the CWFLU made numerous attempts to organize farm workers during the winter months, and the two men also focused on promoting interracial cooperation and ending discrimination in the community. Farm Division organizers attempted to organize workers in Yakima, Kent, Everett, Bainbridge Island and the White River area, but were often met with harsh opposition from local officials and vigilantes.

AFL conflict

Local 18257 came into conflict with the AFL, in 1937 when the parent body, attempting to separate the union along racial lines, recognized a Japanese local organized by Clarence Arai. Local 18257 successfully retained negotiation rights and dispatched its workers in 1937 despite pickets set up by the rival group. Bitterness toward the AFL resulted from the incidents and led to a November 4 vote by the Seattle, Portland, and San Francisco locals to affiliate with the newly formed United Cannery, Agricultural, Packing, and Allied Workers of America-CIO (UCAPAWA). In Seattle, Local 18257 became UCAPAWA, Local 7 and in San Francisco and Portland Cannery Workers unions also joined UCAPAWA Opponents of re-affiliation, led by John Ayamo and called the "defeated candidates party," received the old 18257 charter and challenged Local 7 for the right to represent cannery workers. On May 4, 1938 the issue was settled in Local 7's favor in a National Labor Relations Board (NLRB) supervised election. The industry representative, Canned Salmon Industry Inc., subsequently recognized the victorious union. Ayamo later formed another AFL union, the Alaska Fish Cannery Workers, under the jurisdiction of the Seafarers International Union. In 1937 also, the CWFLU merged with a rival, the Filipino Protective Association. I.R. Cabatit was president of the union during the period of rivalry with the AFL. When he was succeeded by Trinidad Rojo in 1939, the CWFLU, Local 7 was on the verge of bankruptcy. It was discovered that officers had been selling membership cards, misappropriating funds and neglecting their duties. Rojo cut expenses and returned the union to a sound financial footing.

References

External links
Filipino Cannery Unionism Across Three Generations 1930s-1980s, Seattle Civil Rights and Labor History Project.
Cannery Workers and Their Unions, University of Washington Departments.

Archives 
 Cannery Workers and Farm Laborers Union Local 7 records. 1915–2000 (inclusive). 46.31 cubic feet. 3927 (Accession No. 3927-001). Labor Archives of Washington, University of Washington Libraries Special Collections. 
 Tyree Scott Papers. Circa 1970–1995 (inclusive dates). 73.00 cubic feet. (73 boxes). 5245 (Accession No. 5245-001). Labor Archives of Washington, University of Washington Libraries Special Collections.

Filipino-American history
Food processing trade unions
Trade unions established in 1933
Trade unions in Washington (state)
1933 establishments in Washington (state)